Aaron Maurice O'Driscoll (born 4 April 1999) is an Irish professional footballer who plays as a defender, most recently for Shelbourne.

Club career
Born in Dublin, O'Driscoll played youth football for Cherry Orchard before signing for Manchester City's academy in 2014. He was released by Manchester City after two seasons at the club, having suffered an injury in his second. He signed a professional contract with Southampton in July 2016. He appeared nine times for the club's under-21 side in the EFL Trophy before being released in summer 2020.

He signed a two-year contract with League Two side Mansfield Town following a trial period with the club. He made his debut for the club on 29 August 2020 in a 4–0 EFL Trophy defeat away to Preston North End. On 26 February 2021, Aaron joined Longford Town on loan until the end of November. He made his debut for the club on 20 March 2021 in a 2–0 home win over Derry City. In a difficult season for the team which ended with Longford's relegation from the League of Ireland Premier Division, O'Driscoll played every game and was a standout performer being awarded the supporters player of the year award.

On 13 January 2022, O'Driscoll signed for League of Ireland Premier Division side Shelbourne.

International career
O'Driscoll made one appearance for the Republic of Ireland at under-17 level. He also played at under-19 level alongside future senior internationals including Aaron Connolly, Lee O'Connor and Dara O'Shea.

Personal life
He is the son of former footballer Maurice O'Driscoll, who won the League of Ireland Premier Division with St Patrick's Athletic.

Career statistics

References

1999 births
Living people
Republic of Ireland association footballers
Republic of Ireland youth international footballers
Association footballers from Dublin (city)
Association football defenders
Cherry Orchard F.C. players
Manchester City F.C. players
Southampton F.C. players
Mansfield Town F.C. players
Longford Town F.C. players
Shelbourne F.C. players
English Football League players
League of Ireland players
Irish expatriate sportspeople in England
Republic of Ireland expatriate association footballers
Expatriate footballers in England